Oliveriplectanum is a genus of monopisthocotylean monogeneans belonging to the family Diplectanidae.
All its species are parasites on marine perciform fishes (Lutjanidae, Priacanthidae).

Etymology
The genus was named Guy Oliver, "in recognition of his valuable work on the Diplectanidae".

Species
According to the World Register of Marine Species, there are only three species in the genus. All three have been described previously as members of Diplectanum by Satyu Yamaguti. All the species were found on fish collected off Hawaii.

 Oliveriplectanum curvivagina (Yamaguti, 1968) Domingues & Boeger, 2008
 Oliveriplectanum opakapaka (Yamaguti, 1968) Domingues & Boeger, 2008
 Oliveriplectanum priacanthi (Yamaguti, 1968) Domingues & Boeger, 2008

References

Diplectanidae
Monogenea genera
Parasites of fish